The list of shipwrecks in June 1828 includes all ships sunk, foundered, grounded, or otherwise lost during June 1828.

3 June

5 June

6 June

8 June

11 June

14 June

15 June

16 June

17 June

20 June

23 June

25 June

29 June

30 June

Unknown date

References

1828-06